Kirill Valerievich Käro (born 24 February 1975) is a Russian actor of Estonian descent. He is best known for playing the lead character in 32 episodes of The Sniffer (2013–2017), as George Safronov in 16 episodes of the Netflix sci-fi series Better than Us (2019), and as Sergey in the thriller series To the Lake (2020).

Biography

Early years
Kirill Käro was born in Tallinn, Estonia.
His father was a sea captain of mixed Estonian-Russian descent, and his Russian mother was a teacher. His first cousin, once removed, is actor Volli Käro.
After graduating from secondary school at Lasnamäe in 1992, Käro entered a five-year acting course at the Boris Shchukin Theatre Institute in Moscow. Following graduation in 1997, he continued to work at the  Boris Shchukin Theatre Institute under the mentorship of Armen Dzhigarkhanyan.

Käro returned to Tallinn in 1999, acting at the Russian Theatre for five years, before going back to Moscow to the Praktika Theatre in 2004.

Career
Käro's career in film and television began in 2008 with various small parts. In 2013, he landed the leading role in The Sniffer, for which he won the Association of Film and TV Producers award in the category Best Actor.

In 2019, he played the main role of George Safronov in sixteen episodes of the Netflix Russian android thriller series Better than Us.

In 2020, Käro starred as Sergey in the lead role of the Russian television series To the Lake. The show was acquired by Netflix and broadcast in October 2020.

Selected filmography

Film

Television

References

External links
 
 

Male actors from Tallinn
1975 births
Living people
Estonian male film actors
Estonian male television actors
Estonian male stage actors
21st-century Estonian male actors
Estonian people of Russian descent
Estonian expatriates in Russia